Marija Mladenović (born 19 October 1978) is a Serbian sports shooter. She competed in the women's 10 metre air pistol event at the 1996 Summer Olympics.

References

1978 births
Living people
Serbian female sport shooters
Olympic shooters of Yugoslavia
Shooters at the 1996 Summer Olympics
Place of birth missing (living people)